Markus Münch (born 13 June 1986) is a retired German athlete. He competed for Germany in discus at the 2012 Summer Olympics.

He announced his retirement in December 2017.

Competition record

References

German male discus throwers
Athletes (track and field) at the 2012 Summer Olympics
Olympic athletes of Germany
Universiade medalists in athletics (track and field)
1986 births
Living people
Place of birth missing (living people)
Universiade bronze medalists for Germany
World Athletics Championships athletes for Germany
Medalists at the 2009 Summer Universiade